is a Japanese retired mixed martial artist and a former Shooto Welterweight (76 kg) Champion. He trained alongside Norifumi "Kid" Yamamoto with the Killer Bee team.

Career
After a background in judo, Kikuchi began his mixed martial arts career in the Shooto leagues.  As an amateur, Kikuchi won the 2001 All-Japan Shooto Championship.  Turning professional, Kikuchi defeated his first five opponents in the organization and one additional opponent in Hawaii's SuperBrawl. He suffered his first loss in August 2003 to American Jake Shields in a bout that would determine a contender for the vacant Shooto Welterweight Championship; Shields went on to become the first Welterweight Champion in Shooto since 2001. Kikuchi met Shields in a rematch in December 2004 and was victorious in a unanimous judges' decision, becoming the Welterweight Champion.

Following the route of training partner Norifumi Yamamoto, Kikuchi debuted in the K-1 HERO'S promotion in July 2005, defeating Katsuya Inoue by first-round technical knockout. Kikuchi would secure another victory in HERO'S, overcoming a knockdown to take a decision over former Pancrase Welterweight Champion Kiuma Kunioku before returning to Shooto the next year.

Kikuchi was defeated in his first title defense against Shinya Aoki at Shooto: Victory of the Truth in February 2006, and controversy following the bout would result in the Killer Bee gym's suspension from Shooto. Norifumi Yamamoto, a key member of Killer Bee, allegedly struck and verbally assaulted a Shooto official.  The official, who was examining a laceration on Kikuchi's face from the title bout immediately prior to the incident, appeared before the International Shooto Commission. In the hearings, Yamamoto apologized for the incident, and Killer Bee was relieved of the suspension six months later.  Due to the suspension length, Kikuchi fought only once more in 2006.

On February 17, 2007, exactly one year after their first encounter, Kikuchi and Shinya Aoki met for a second time in the Professional Shooto league. Aoki, the champion, defeated Kikuchi and defended the Shooto Welterweight Championship by split judges' decision.

In January 2007, it was announced that Kikuchi was entered into a welterweight tournament to be held by the World Wide Cage Network. The WWCN anticipated that the tournament champion will be sent to compete among the Ultimate Fighting Championship's welterweight roster.  Kikuchi's first bout in the tournament, against Jared Rollins, was scheduled for March 17 in Tokyo.  Kikuchi was victorious in a second-round technical knockout, advancing him to the next round of the tournament.  In the semi-finals of the tournament, Kikuchi fought fellow Shooto veteran Yoshiyuki Yoshida.  In what was seen as an upset, Yoshida was victorious in a first-round technical knockout due to strikes on the ground.

In early 2008, Kikuchi announced his retirement from mixed martial arts.

Mixed martial arts record

|-
|   Loss
| align=center| 16-4
| Yoshiyuki Yoshida
| TKO (elbows)
| Greatest Common Multiple: Cage Force 4
| 
| align=center| 1
| align=center| 4:33
| Tokyo, Japan
| 
|-
|   Win
| align=center| 16-3
| Ju Pyo Hong
| TKO (punches)
| Greatest Common Multiple: Cage Force 3
| 
| align=center| 1
| align=center| 3:06
| Tokyo, Japan
| 
|-
|   Win
| align=center| 15-3
| Jared Rollins
| TKO (punches)
| Greatest Common Multiple: Cage Force 2
| 
| align=center| 2
| align=center| 1:34
| Tokyo, Japan
| 
|-
|   Loss
| align=center| 14-3
| Shinya Aoki
| Decision (split)
| Shooto: Back To Our Roots 1
| 
| align=center| 3
| align=center| 5:00
| Yokohama, Japan
| For Shooto Welterweight Championship
|-
|   Win
| align=center| 14-2
| Ronald Jhun
| Submission (armlock)
| Shooto: Champion Carnival
| 
| align=center| 1
| align=center| 1:58
| Yokohama, Japan
| 
|-
|   Loss
| align=center| 13-2
| Shinya Aoki
| Decision (unanimous)
| Shooto: The Victory of the Truth
| 
| align=center| 3
| align=center| 5:00
| Tokyo, Japan
| Lost Shooto Welterweight Championship
|-
|   Win
| align=center| 13-1
| Kiuma Kunioku
| Decision (unanimous)
| K-1 Hero's 3
| 
| align=center| 3
| align=center| 5:00
| Tokyo, Japan
| 
|-
|   Win
| align=center| 12-1
| Katsuya Inoue
| TKO (punches)
| K-1 Hero's 2
| 
| align=center| 1
| align=center| 1:41
| Tokyo, Japan
| 
|-
|   Win
| align=center| 11-1
| Jason Brudvik
| TKO (punches)
| Shooto: 4/23 in Hakata Star Lanes
| 
| align=center| 1
| align=center| 2:32
| Fukuoka, Japan
| 
|-
|   Win
| align=center| 10-1
| Jake Shields
| Decision (unanimous)
| Shooto: Year End Show 2004
| 
| align=center| 3
| align=center| 5:00
| Tokyo, Japan
| Won Shooto Welterweight Championship 
|-
|   Win
| align=center| 9-1
| Ramunas Komas
| Submission (armbar)
| Shooto: 9/26 in Kourakuen Hall
| 
| align=center| 2
| align=center| 2:21
| Tokyo, Japan
| 
|-
|   Win
| align=center| 8-1
| Jutaro Nakao
| Decision (majority)
| Shooto 2004: 5/3 in Korakuen Hall
| 
| align=center| 3
| align=center| 5:00
| Tokyo, Japan
| 
|-
|   Win
| align=center| 7-1
| Sammy Morgan
| Submission (armbar)
| Shooto: 3/4 in Kitazawa Town Hall
| 
| align=center| 1
| align=center| 2:51
| Tokyo, Japan
| 
|-
|   Loss
| align=center| 6-1
| Jake Shields
| Decision (unanimous)
| Shooto: 8/10 in Yokohama Cultural Gymnasium
| 
| align=center| 3
| align=center| 5:00
| Yokohama, Japan
| 
|-
|   Win
| align=center| 6-0
| Seichi Ikemoto
| Submission (armbar)
| Shooto 2003: 6/27 in Hiroshima Sun Plaza
| 
| align=center| 2
| align=center| 1:28
| Hiroshima, Japan
| 
|-
|   Win
| align=center| 5-0
| Toru Nakayama
| TKO (punches)
| Shooto: 2/23 in Korakuen Hall
| 
| align=center| 1
| align=center| 2:53
| Tokyo, Japan
| 
|-
|   Win
| align=center| 4-0
| Kolo Koka
| Submission (keylock)
| SuperBrawl 27
| 
| align=center| 1
| align=center| 3:09
| Honolulu, Hawaii, United States
| 
|-
|   Win
| align=center| 3-0
| Shigetoshi Iwase
| Decision (unanimous)
| Shooto: Treasure Hunt 9
| 
| align=center| 2
| align=center| 5:00
| Tokyo, Japan
| 
|-
|   Win
| align=center| 2-0
| Jani Lax
| Submission (kimura)
| Shooto: Wanna Shooto 2002
| 
| align=center| 1
| align=center| 2:51
| Tokyo, Japan
| 
|-
|   Win
| align=center| 1-0
| Yoichi Fukumoto
| Submission (armbar)
| Shooto: Treasure Hunt 2
| 
| align=center| 1
| align=center| 3:18
| Tokyo, Japan
|

See also
List of male mixed martial artists

References and footnotes

External links

Killer Bee official website

Living people
1978 births
Japanese male mixed martial artists
Welterweight mixed martial artists
Mixed martial artists utilizing judo
Japanese male judoka
Sportspeople from Miyagi Prefecture